Russell Effaney Kun (born 24 May 1966) is a political figure from the Pacific nation of Nauru and former powerlifter.

Background

In the May 2003 elections Kun stood for the Parliament of Nauru, and was duly was elected to represent the Ubenide constituency.

Political offices

He was Justice Minister in the Ludwig Scotty government from June to August 2003 and returned to that post under René Harris in February 2004. Kun was elected the Speaker of the Parliament of Nauru from 15 July 2004 to 26 October 2004. 

He lost the post again, however, in June 2004 when Scotty became President again and appointed David Adeang to the post. In September 2004 he became controversial after stating that Health Minister Kieren Keke was ineligible to serve. He lost his seat in Parliament in the October 2004 elections because of the State of Emergency and was out of job in Nauru.

Post-parliamentary career

From 17 July 2005, Kun subsequently worked in the Public Defender's office in Majuro, Marshall Islands, along with Lionel Aingimea, the former legal officer of Nauru. From 19 April 2007, he was the Chief Public Defender of Marshall Islands and is still at this post.

Kun married Tote Una Kun, and they separated in 2007. They have two children: a daughter born 1991 in Auckland, and a son born 1994 in Wellington.

Kun is now living with his partner, Roselinda deBrum, of Likiep, Marshall Islands, and they have one daughter born 2006 in Majuro, Marshall Islands.

On 18 August 2010, Kun was sworn in as a citizen of the Marshall Islands.

See also
 Politics of Nauru

References

Speakers of the Parliament of Nauru
Members of the Parliament of Nauru
Living people
People from Anetan District
Nauruan emigrants to the Marshall Islands
1966 births
Government ministers of Nauru
Nauruan male weightlifters
Public defenders
21st-century Nauruan politicians